FC Lokomotiv Gomel is a Belarusian football club based in Gomel.

History
The team was founded in 2008 as Gomelzheldortrans, and later that same year, they won the Gomel Oblast championship. Following a successful performance in the final tournament among the winners of regional leagues, at the end of the year, the Gomelzheldortrans were promoted to the Belarusian Second League. In 2014, Gomelzheldortrans made their debut in the First League.

In December 2016, the club changed its name to Lokomotiv Gomel

Current squad
As of March 2023

References

External links

Association football clubs established in 2008
Football clubs in Belarus
2008 establishments in Belarus